Meu Pedacinho de Chão (English: My Little Piece of Ground) is a Brazilian telenovela written by Benedito Ruy Barbosa and directed by Luiz Fernando Carvalho produced and broadcast by TV Globo. It aired from April 7 to August 1, 2014. Based on the 1971 telenovela of the same name created by Benedito Ruy Barbosa.

It starred Bruna Linzmeyer, Irandhir Santos, Johnny Massaro, Bruno Fagundes, Rodrigo Lombardi, Juliana Paes, Osmar Prado, Antônio Fagundes, Geytsa Garcia and Tomás Sampaio.

Cast

References

External links 
  
 Luiz Fernando Carvalho - Official website 

2014 telenovelas
Brazilian telenovelas
2014 Brazilian television series debuts
2014 Brazilian television series endings
TV Globo telenovelas
Children's telenovelas
Television series reboots
Telenovelas directed by Luiz Fernando Carvalho
Portuguese-language telenovelas